Roberts Suharevs (born 27 January 1970) is a Latvian luger. He competed at the 1992 Winter Olympics, the 1994 Winter Olympics and the 1998 Winter Olympics.

References

External links
 

1970 births
Living people
Latvian male lugers
Olympic lugers of Latvia
Lugers at the 1992 Winter Olympics
Lugers at the 1994 Winter Olympics
Lugers at the 1998 Winter Olympics
People from Sigulda